The Italian Society of Financial Analysts (Italian: Associazione Italiana degli Analisti e Consulenti Finanziari (AIAF)) is a professional organisation, representing members of the Italian financial profession. It was created in 1971  and currently has over 1000 members. AIAF is a member of EFFAS and ACIIA.

AIAF plays an active role in the financial market. As the main European financial analysts societies, it advises the Italian financial authorities and assists Italian listed companies in their dealings with the financial community. It has established a code of ethics for the analyst profession in Italy. The Society runs a professional financial training school which is certified to issue the Certified International Investment Analyst (CIIA) diploma.

The society publishes a magazine, "La Rivista AIAF" and some books "I quaderni AIAF".

References

External links
official site
effas.com

Business and finance professional associations
Analyst societies